Chaval may refer to:
 Chaval, Ceará, a municipality in Brazil
 Chaval (cartoonist), a French author and cartoonist
 Chaval, a main character in the 1885 novel Germinal by Émile Zola
 Mount Chaval, a mountain in Washington state

See also 
 Cheval (disambiguation)
 Kristijan Čaval, Croatian football player
 Chaval Outdoor, a privately owned company that designs and manufactures heated clothing